In greek mythology, Aegaeus was one of the potamoi, or river-gods. He lived on the island of Scheria, widely considered to be the modern island of Corfu.

He was the father of Melite, who bore Heracles a son, Hyllus, and of the nymphs Aigaiides.

References

Potamoi